Urocopia is a genus of cyclopoid copepods in the family Urocopiidae, the sole genus of the family. There are at least three described species in Urocopia.

Species
These three species belong to the genus Urocopia:
 Urocopia deeveyae (Boxshall, 1981)
 Urocopia moria (Olson, 1949)
 Urocopia singularis Sars G.O., 1917

References

Cyclopoida